The Finding of Erichthonius is a fragment of a larger painting by Peter Paul Rubens, produced around 1632 or 1633. It is now held at the Allen Memorial Art Museum in Oberlin, Ohio. It shows the discovery of Erichthonius in a basket by one of the daughters of Cecrops (either Pandrosus or Aglaulus).

External links
http://allenartcollection.oberlin.edu/emuseum/view/objects/asitem/id/9742

1633 paintings
Mythological paintings by Peter Paul Rubens
Paintings in the collection of the Allen Memorial Art Museum